The 2000 United States presidential election in Hawaii was part of the 2000 United States presidential election which took place on November 7, 2000. Voters chose 4 electors to the Electoral College, who voted for president and vice president.

Hawaii was won by Vice President Al Gore by an 18.3% margin of victory. Gore also was victorious in every county and both congressional districts of the state. Governor George W. Bush received 37.5% of the vote, while Nader obtained almost 6%.
Bush's best county result came in Honolulu County where he received 39.6% of the vote. This was the first election since its statehood in which it did not support the same candidate as West Virginia.

Results

By county

By congressional district
Gore won both congressional districts.

Electors 

Technically the voters of Hawaii cast their ballots for electors: representatives to the Electoral College. Hawaii is allocated 4 electors because it has 2 congressional districts and 2 senators. All candidates who appear on the ballot or qualify to receive write-in votes must submit a list of 4 electors, who pledge to vote for their candidate and his or her running mate. Whoever wins the majority of votes in the state is awarded all 4 electoral votes. Their chosen electors then vote for president and vice president. Although electors are pledged to their candidate and running mate, they are not obligated to vote for them. An elector who votes for someone other than his or her candidate is known as a faithless elector.

The electors of each state and the District of Columbia met on December 18, 2000 to cast their votes for president and vice president. The Electoral College itself never meets as one body. Instead the electors from each state and the District of Columbia met in their respective capitols.

The following were the members of the Electoral College from the state. All were pledged to and voted for Al Gore and Joe Lieberman:
Michael Amii
Marsha Joyner
Joy Kobashigawa Lewis
Pedro Racelis

References

Hawaii
2000
2000 Hawaii elections